Stay with Me (Chinese: 放弃我, 抓紧我) is a 2016 Chinese television series starring Joe Chen and Wang Kai. The series aired on Hunan TV from 11 December 2016 to 2 January 2017.  Streaming rights outside mainland China are owned by Zhong Ju Du Bo.

Synopsis 
Due to a near-drowning accident, Li Weiwei (Joe Chen) a famous fashion designer, loses parts of her memory. After she wakes up, her memory begins at the age of 23. The boyfriend in her memory, Chen Yidu (Wang Kai), is now her rival at work, while her childhood best friend, Huo Xiao (Kimi Qiao), is now her fiancé. Weiwei does not believe that she broke up with Yidu and investigates the reason to as why they did. Afraid of losing her and trying to protect her, Huo Xiao tries to hinder her plan in every possible way. After she recalls the full picture, she realizes that busy lives had kept her and her loved ones from the dream they once pursued so passionately. As confrontations and misunderstandings piled up, Yidu broke up with her. At the age of 30, Weiwei is determined to change the way things are going, erasing misunderstandings from the past, erasing conflicts between them, never stopping until she finds love and the dream and heart she once possessed.

Cast

Main

 Joe Chen (v. Ji Guanlin) as Li Weiwei (Vivian)
 30 years old, Chief Designer of Ling Long. After an accident, her memory gets stuck at 23 years old.
 Wang Kai (v. Chen Yidu) as Wang Kai
 35 years old, CEO of Du. Weiwei's ex-boyfriend.
 Qiao Renliang (v. Huo Xiao) as Ling Zhenhe
 32 years old, CEO of Ling Long. Weiwei's childhood friend and fiance.
 Chen Ran (v. Bai Xue) as Tian Jinfeng (Tiffany)
 31 years old, Chief Designer of Du. She has an unrequited crush on Yidu.
 Derek Chang as Zhang Li'ao (Leo)
 24 years old, a famous international supermodel. He is Weiwei's adopted orphan brother.

Supporting

 Zhang Duo as Mo Fan
 Wall's Street Investor. Yidu's good friend and brother.
 Tse Kwan-ho as Huo Ruiqiang
 Huo Xiao's father, CEO of Ling Long
 Miao Haizhong as Huo Ruiyong
 Huo Xiao's uncle. He aspires to topple over Weiwei and take over her position as Chief Designer.
 Cao Ranran as Ou Ye, Huo Xiao's secretary. He likes Zhen Ni.
 Liu Mengmeng as Zhen Ni, Weiwei's assistant. She looks up to and admires Weiwei.
 Guo Junhao as Cao Zhong, Yidu's assistant.
 Wang Xiaomao as Su Fei, Weiwei's subordinate.
 Zheng Long as Qiao Zhi, Weiwei's subordinate.
 Fu Jia as Lao Wan, Weiwei's subordinate.
 Du Yuting as Secretary Zhu, Huo Ruiyong's assistant.
 Qi Hang as Kang Xing
 A spy who works at Ling Long as the marketing manager, in order to harm Weiwei and destroy her relationships with Yidu and Huo Xiao.
 Zhao Zimo as Secretary Wang, he helps Huo Xiao to investigate Weiwei's accident in Paris.
 Du Ninglin as Yidu's mother

Soundtrack

Ratings

 Highest ratings are marked in red, lowest ratings are marked in blue

Stay With Me ranked in the top ten highest rated television dramas of 2016.

References

External links
 Stay with Me on YouTube
 Stay with Me with English Subs on YouTube
 Stay with Me on Sohu
 Stay with Me on Tencent
 Stay with Me on LeTV
 Stay with Me on iQiyi

Chinese romantic comedy television series
2016 Chinese television series debuts
Television shows set in China
Mandarin-language television shows
Hunan Television dramas